Microzancla is a monotypic snout moth genus. Its single species, Microzancla ignitalis, was described by George Hampson in 1897. It is found in the Brazilian states of São Paulo and Rio de Janeiro.

References

Chrysauginae
Monotypic moth genera
Moths of South America
Pyralidae genera